Betapapillomavirus is a genus of viruses, in the family Papillomaviridae. Human serve as natural hosts. There are six species in this genus. Diseases associated with this genus include warts, papilloma, and malignant tumours.

Taxonomy
The following six species are assigned to the genus:
 Betapapillomavirus 1
 Betapapillomavirus 2
 Betapapillomavirus 3
 Betapapillomavirus 4
 Betapapillomavirus 5
 Betapapillomavirus 6

Structure
Viruses in Betapapillomavirus are non-enveloped, with icosahedral geometries, and T=7 symmetry. The diameter is around 60 nm. Genomes are circular, around 8kb in length.

Life cycle
Viral replication is nuclear. Entry into the host cell is achieved by attachment of the viral proteins to host receptors, which mediates endocytosis. Replication follows the dsDNA bidirectional replication model. Dna templated transcription, with some alternative splicing mechanism is the method of transcription. The virus exits the host cell by nuclear envelope breakdown.
Human serve as the natural host. Transmission routes are contact.

References

External links
 ICTV Report Papillomaviridae
 Viralzone: Betapapillomavirus

Papillomavirus
Virus genera